Ziad Majed is a Lebanese/French political researcher and university professor. He holds a PhD in political sciences from Sciences Po Paris.

He teaches Middle Eastern studies and International Relations at the American University of Paris and writes articles, papers and studies on reforms, democratic transitions, elections, civil society and citizenship in Lebanon, Syria and the Arab region. International IDEA and other institutes, journals and newspapers in Paris, London and Beirut published many of these research papers and articles.

After working for 10 years at the Lebanese Red Cross and the Lebanese Center for Policy Studies, he contributed in 2004 to the foundation of the Democratic Left Movement (along with the late Samir Kassir, Elias Khoury and many intellectuals, politicians, students and militants), and participated in the peaceful Independence Uprising in March 2005 against the Syrian regime's hegemony and political assassinations.

In 2006, he published a book in Arabic entitled "On the Spring of Beirut" at Dar Annahar, gathering texts and papers on Lebanese politics.

In 2007, he founded with researchers from Morocco, Algeria, Tunisia, Egypt, Jordan, Lebanon, Yemen and Bahrain the Network for the Study of Democracy.

In 2010, he published an essay (in English) on "Hezbollah and the Lebanese Shiite Community" (Aspin Institute - Washington DC), analyzing Lebanese politics and its sectarian characteristics.

In 2014, he published a book in Arabic and French entitled "Syria, the Orphan Revolution" at "L'Orient des livres" (Beirut) and "Actes Sud" (Paris). The book explores the situation in Syria and the regional and international political dynamics related to the Syrian conflict.

In 2017, he published an essay in English on Iran's Middle Eastern politics entitled "Iran and its four Arab fronts" (the International Institute of Social Research, Amsterdam).

In 2018, he co-authored a new book (in French) on Syria entitled "Inside the mind of Bachar Al-Assad" (Actes Sud, Paris).

He currently lives in France, and visits Lebanon regularly to organise or attend political and cultural events.

References

Profile on AUP website: https://www.aup.edu/profile/zmajed

External links
Official Website (Arabic): http://ziadmajed.blogspot.com
Official Blog (English/French): http://vendredis-arabes.blogspot.com
Facebook Page: https://www.facebook.com/ZiadMajed05
Twitter Account: https://twitter.com/ziadmajed
YouTube Channel: https://www.youtube.com/user/ziad0505/videos?view_as=subscriber

Living people
Lebanese left-wing activists
Lebanese democracy activists
Lebanese political scientists
Academic staff of the American University of Paris
1970 births